My Perfect You is a 2018 Philippine romantic comedy drama film directed by Cathy Garcia-Molina, produced and distributed by Star Cinema. Starring Gerald Anderson and Pia Wurtzbach. This is Pia Wurtzbach's second film after Gandarrapiddo: The Revenger Squad, which was released theatrically on December 25, 2017. The story is about Burn (Gerald Anderson), a man who's down in the dumps, and Abi (Pia Wurtzbach), the girl who helps him see the light again. The film was released on March 14, 2018.

Plot
Burn Toledo (Gerald Anderson) loses control of his life after his marriage proposal is rejected by his girlfriend Angel (Marlann Flores) and is fired from his job. He drives away to a far place and crashes his car. He ends up in Happy Sunshine Camp, a remote resort, where he meets the owner, Abi (Pia Wurtzbach). He instantly forms a dislike towards her due to her perky demeanour as all-around worker in the remote resort. Burn soon apologizes for his rash and awful behaviour and with the help of Bubut (Wilma Doesnt), Handres (Janus Del Prado) and Lucky (Darwin Tolentino), helps restore the resort to its former shape as payment for his debt. He begins to form a bond with Abi as he spends more time with her.

In reality, Burn is revealed to have developed schizophrenia after sustaining head injuries due to the accident. He is treated by his doctor and friend Aris (RJ Ledesma) who informed Burn's father Roel (Tonton Gutierrez) and his older sister Ellaine (Dimples Romana) about his condition. Roel angrily refuses to treat his son's illness since his wife died with the same illness. Burn has psychotic episodes towards his father when he angrily attempts to snap him out into reality, indicating that Abi, the Happy Sunshine Camp, and the people in it are imaginary.

During the re-opening of Happy Sunshine Camp, Burn finally faces the reality that Abi, her friends, and the people whom they called their first visitors in the remote resort are imaginary. In the real world, he is rescued by Ellaine as he was drowning in the bathtub the whole time. Burn's mental condition continues to worsen, convincing Roel to have Aris treat his son's mental illness. As Burn is being treated, his memories of Abi and her friends at the hospital begins to fade. Burn finally says goodbye to Abi, and they part ways. Burn recovers from his mental illness after six months of treatment and reunites with his family.

One day while spending time with his family, including Tetet (Xia Vigor), Ellaine tells him to meet a certain person at a coffee shop. On the way, Burn sees two other people who look like the same people he met at the Happy Sunshine Camp. At the coffee shop, meets the barista Bie, who happens to look exactly like Abi. Since Burn's memory of Abi has been erased, he doesn't remember her but looks familiar to him. Burn finally introduces himself to Bie and he smiles, happy to meet her in person.

Cast

Main cast

Gerald Anderson as Burn Toledo
Pia Wurtzbach as Abi/Abie "Bie" Marie Garcia-Molina

Supporting cast
Dimples Romana as Ellaine Toledo
Tonton Gutierrez as Roel Toledo
Janus Del Prado as Handres
Wilma Doesnt as Bubut
Darwin Tolentino as Lucky
RJ Ledesma as Aris
Xia Vigor as Tetet
Paolo O'hara as Mr. Ledesma
Marlann Flores as Angel

Production
On January 18, 2018, Star Cinema announced that Pia Wurtzbach is set to do a new film with Gerald Anderson after her successful MMFF film Gandarrapiddo: The Revenger Squad with Vice Ganda and Daniel Padilla. It was announced Thursday shortly after a story conference where the lead stars were in attendance. The film  will be helmed by box-office director Cathy Garcia-Molina.

The filming started on January 25, 2018. Anderson and Wurtzbach were spotted in Kidz Pool Resort at Sitio Coto, Masinloc, Zambales where the film was taken.

On March 2, 2018, Star Cinema finally released the official theatrical trailer and poster of My Perfect You.

Release
My Perfect You premiered in Philippine cinemas on March 14, 2018. Released in 200 Cinemas earning 10 million on its opening day. It is also released on some selected countries.

Critical response
Oggs Cruz of Rappler stated "Director Cathy Garcia-Molina is currently the Philippines' foremost crafter of escapist fantasies.

She, however, doesn't peddle her works as portraits of possible realities. She's aware that her stories are diversions to the drastically harsher lives of her film's audience, populating her perfect love stories with women who are obviously wearing outrageous wigs, seemingly in an effort to highlight the fact that nothing in the films' fairy tale endings can be farther from the truth.

My Perfect You appears to be the strangest in Garcia-Molina's filmography, even stranger than My Only Ü (2008), which had the characters played by Vhong Navarro and Toni Gonzaga commit to a romance even in the afterlife.

What makes My Perfect You stand out is how it isn't exactly a love story but an examination of Burn, played excellently by Gerald Anderson, a man desperate for an escape from the many problems that ail his life. The film opens with him running away from his family, hurriedly driving to an unknown destination until he swerves into a ravine trying to avoid hitting a pedestrian who suddenly appears in the middle of the road. He gets out of his damaged car and finds himself in a decrepit resort managed by overeager and endlessly optimistic Abi, played by surprisingly soulful Miss Universe winner-turned-actress Pia Wurtzbach."

References

External links

Philippine romantic comedy-drama films
2018 romantic comedy-drama films
Filipino-language films